Lucy & Desi: Before the Laughter is a 1991 television movie from CBS about the lives of Lucille Ball and Desi Arnaz. The movie begins when the two actors met in the 1930's and ends with their divorce in 1960. The movie covers how their careers developed, their often rocky marriage, and how they came to develop the I Love Lucy show. It recreates a number of scenes from classic I Love Lucy episodes, including "Lucy Thinks Ricky Is Trying to Murder Her" and "Lucy Does a TV Commercial". The television movie was directed by Charles Jarrott, written by William Luce, with screenplay by William Luce and Cynthia A. Cherbak.

Cast
 Frances Fisher - Lucille Ball 
 Maurice Benard - Desi Arnaz
 Robin Pearson Rose - Vivian Vance
 John Wheeler - William Frawley
 Edith Díaz - Dolores Arnaz
 Liane Langland - Maureen O'Hara
 Matthew Faison - Harry
 Bette Ford - DeDe Ball
 Patrick Cronin - Doc Bender
 Jim Brochu - Max
 Joyce Blair - Roxana
 Rance Howard - Bernie
 Larry Anderson - Percy
 Howard Schechter - Jess Oppenheimer
 Doug Franklin - Marc Daniels
 Alan Oppenheimer - Arthur Lyons
 Roger Rose - cousin Larry
 Don Keefer - Grandpa Ball

References

External links
 
 
 Trailer

Lucille Ball
CBS network films
Films about marriage
Adultery in films
I Love Lucy
Films directed by Charles Jarrott